The Groot River is a river in the southern area of the Eastern Cape province of South Africa. It is a right hand tributary of the Gamtoos River.   This river passes through Steytlerville.

Course
The Groot River originates at a point where the Kariega River and the Sout River meet, although they enter the Beervlei Dam as the Sout River. Beyond the dam, the river becomes the Groot River, running southeast. Near the town of Steytlerville it turns slightly southwards before heading eastward again, lastly bending southwards before it joins the Kouga River to form the Gamtoos at the confluence.

See also 
 List of rivers of South Africa

References

Rivers of the Eastern Cape